The Face of Fu Manchu is a 1965 thriller film directed by Don Sharp and based on the characters created by Sax Rohmer. It stars Christopher Lee as the eponymous villain, a Chinese criminal mastermind, and Nigel Green as his pursuing rival Nayland Smith, a Scotland Yard detective.

The film was a British-West German co-production, and was the first in a five-part series starring Lee and produced by Harry Alan Towers for Constantin Film, the second of which was The Brides of Fu Manchu released the next year, with the final entry being The Castle of Fu Manchu in 1969. Only the first two were directed by Sharp.

It was shot in Technicolor and Techniscope on location in County Dublin, Ireland.

Plot

The beheading of international criminal mastermind Dr. Fu Manchu is witnessed in China by his nemesis Nayland Smith. Back in London, however, it is increasingly apparent to Smith that Dr. Fu Manchu is still operating. Despite the skepticism by his close friend Dr. Petrie, Smith is quick to detect that the execution he witnessed was that of a double, an actor hypnotized into taking Dr. Fu Manchu's place. The villain is back in London, and has kidnapped the esteemed Professor Muller, whose research holds the key to a potentially deadly solution from the seeds of a rare Tibetan flower: the Blackhill poppy. The seed of this poppy is sometimes referred to as "The Seed of Life", and Tibetans spoke legends of it being the secret to eternal life. Although the poppy seed's poison loses its toxicity when exposed to heat, Fu Manchu has heard Tibetan legends that the poison was once weaponized. A pint of this poison is powerful enough to kill every person and animal in London.

Nayland Smith correctly deduces that Professor Muller had received his supply of Blackhill poppy seeds from illegal drug trade. After Fu Manchu cut off the drug trade, the poppy seeds were mainly acquired from Hanuman – a warehouse owner who is secretly in cahoots with Fu Manchu. Nayland Smith meets Hanuman in his warehouse to question him on the whereabouts of Professor Muller. In Hanuman's office, Hanuman pulls a gun on Smith, who is able to knock him out before he can fire. Nayland Smith quickly leaves the building and deliberately avoids giving his attention to Hanuman's secretary, whom he recognizes as Lin Tang – Fu Manchu's daughter and partner-in-crime. Lin Tang recognized Nayland Smith when he entered the building, and she phoned Hanuman to kill Nayland Smith before their meeting in the office.

Hanuman regains consciousness, then he and Lin Tang go underground to a secret base under the River Thames. There, Lin Tang informs her father that his nemesis Nayland Smith has gotten involved in their plans. Lin Tang informs Fu Manchu that their prisoner Professor Muller has refused to divulge how to extract the poisonous essence from the Blackhill poppy seeds. To coerce Professor Muller, Fu Manchu has his henchmen kidnap the professor's daughter Maria. After both prisoners are forced to watch one of Fu Manchu's henchwoman drown (as the henchwoman's punishment for trying to free Professor Muller), Professor Muller then reveals that documents detailing additional properties of the Blackhill poppy were given to Professor Gaskel by the Grand Lama. The documents were given during the Younghusband expedition that Professor Muller resents not being given access to. The documents are currently locked in a vault that only Professor Gaskel has access to. The vault is in a guarded room of the Museum of Oriental Studies.

Fu Manchu's daughter Lin Tang dons a disguise and infiltrates the museum. She drops a listening device. Meanwhile, Fu Manchu's henchmen break into the museum's guarded room by entering through the sewer tunnels. However, Nayland Smith and his allies kill the henchmen only to discover that the vault had been emptied by Professor Gaskel earlier ago. This information, and Gaskel's address, is heard through the listening device of Lin Tang, whom Nayland Smith and company recognize. Nayland Smith and Dr. Petrie engage in a car chase after Lin Tang and Fu Manchu, but the duo escapes.

Professor Gaskel is in his study when Lin Tang and Fu Manchu emerge. Fu Manchu hypnotizes Professor Gaskel to be under his control. They go to Fu Manchu's underground lair, where Professor Gaskel works translating the Younghusband papers on stabilising at room temperature the poisonous essence of the Blackhill poppy with Professor Muller. As they work, Fu Manchu is informed that the Essex village of Fleetwick is currently under freezing temperatures, so the poppy seed's poisonous properties will persist if used there. He makes an announcement on the radio to let the entire country know of his return, and to obey him. As a show of his power, he announces that he will target Fleetwick. Nayland Smith has British Army soldiers sent there to protect Fleetwick. Fu Manchu has a plane fly over the village, with the Blackhill poppy poison being sprayed onto the almost 3000 civilians and soldiers below, killing them within seconds. By this point, Professor Gaskel, his usefulness now over, has also been hypnotized into committing suicide.

Nayland Smith and his associates use some maps and detective work to deduce the entrances and location of Fu Manchu's hideout. With the intent of flooding the hideout, they break in through the hidden entrance in Hanuman's warehouse. They confront Fu Manchu and his minions, and a brawl ensues. After the lights go out, Fu Manchu and his minions escape to a Tibetan monastery with Professor Muller while the River Thames hideout is flooded. Nayland Smith and his team leave the underground hideout via an exit that leads to a graveyard.

Deducing that Blackhill poppy seeds only grow in Tibet, Nayland Smith and company go to there and find Fu Manchu. He is at a Tibetan monastery receiving Blackhill poppy seeds from the Grand Lama. Nayland Smith and company find Professor Muller, who informs them that Fu Manchu already has all the knowledge and poppy seeds he needs to bring the world to its knees. Nayland Smith reassures Professor Muller by revealing that he has a detonator hidden underneath the poppy seeds in one of Fu Manchu's boxes, and it is rigged to explode. Nayland Smith, Professor Muller, and their allies leave the monastery, much to Fu Manchu's frustration. Fu Manchu ponders why Nayland Smith did not take the poppy seeds. A few seconds later, Smith's detonator blows up and the monastery grounds burst in an enormous ball of flame.

Nayland Smith is riding horseback with his allies and sees the explosion from afar. The film ends with a medium closeup of Fu Manchu fading in over the explosion, and his voice uttering, "The world shall hear from me again... the world shall hear from me again".

Cast
Credits adapted from the booklet of the Powerhouse Films Blu-ray boxset The Fu Manchu Cycle: 1965-1969.

 Christopher Lee as Fu Manchu
 Nigel Green as Nayland Smith
 Joachim Fuchsberger as Carl Jannsen
 Karin Dor as Maria Muller
 James Robertson Justice as Sir Charles
 Howard Marion-Crawford as Dr. Petrie
 Tsai Chin as Lin Tang
 Walter Rilla as Professor Muller
 Harry Brogan as Professor Gaskel
 Poulet Tu as Lotus
 Edwin Richfield as Chief Magistrate
 Joe Lynch as Custodian
 Archie O'Sullivan as Chamberlain
 Peter Mossbacher as Hanumon 
 Eric Young as Grand Lama
 Deborah DeLacey as Slave Girl
 Jim Norton as Mathius
 Jack O'Reilly as Constable
 Peter Mayock as Soldier
 Kevin Flood as Traffic Policeman
 John Franklyn as Morgue Attendant
 Conor Evans as River Police Officer
 Derek Young as Village Official
Uncredited:
 Peter Diamond as Dacoit
 George Leech as Dacoit
 Malcolm Jones as Executioner
 Dave Lally as Village Boy

Production
Producer Harry Alan Towers said he decided that "the time was ripe for Fu Manchu. It has all the ingredients of Sherlock Holmes plus a touch of the Kaiser's Yellow Peril. I bet more people have heard of Fu Manchu than Mao Tse-Tung.  And anyway these days you couldn't have a better nationality for a villain." He said his intention from the beginning was to make "four of (sic) five of these" but denied the films were made to cash in on the James Bond craze:
No relationship. Action, adventure, open-air, escapism – yes – but nothing to do with Bond-ism – Fu Manchu's atmosphere is a kind of timeless Never Never land. Bond is gimmicky and with-it.
Towers decided to make it a period film (it is set in 1912) because it "adds to the plausibility". The film was shot on location in the Republic of Ireland, with Towers commenting:
It's a good country for location work; the British quota helps; on costs, there is not much difference between making a film here and in Britain – both sets of unions see to that. Ardmore? It seems to be doing alright with the present film – and Ireland will always be attractive as long as filmmakers and their artists are seeking refuge from super tax.
The prison sequences were shot at Kilmainham Gaol. Director Don Sharp said Harry Alan Towers had to pay off members of the IRA so they could film there. Many of the other scenes were set at Kenure House in Rush, Dublin

Don Sharp said he was recommended as director by the film's completion guarantor. Harry Alan Tower's previous films had been going over budget and schedule, and he had to use a new director; Sharp's name was put forward and the film began an association between Sharp and Tower.

Sharp said "you never know what his [Fu Manchu's] motives are. I mean, he may want to rule the world, blow it up, corner the gold or seduce all the women. The script doesn't say. So we just keep everything moving fast so the audience doesn't have time to think 'but that's impossible' until they get outside."

"There's not much sex in the books," said Towers, "but we've remedied that. We've got damsels in distress, a woman kidnapped, slave girls whipped. It's very kinky."

Soundtrack
The British version of the film was scored by Christopher Whelen, while the German release version was scored by Gert Wilden.  A tie-in song, "Don't Fool with Fu Manchu" performed by The Rockin' Ramrods, was not heard in the film.

Release
In order to promote the film in the U.S., "Fu Manchu for Mayor" posters were done up and distributed in New York City during the mayoral election.

The New York Times did not like the film, saying:
The Face of Fu Manchu, back again after all these years, is about as frightening as Whistler's Mother. If this slow, plodding, simple-minded little color melodrama were not so excruciating, it might have been acceptable farce. Christopher Lee, as the old evil one, complete with waxy mustache, looks and sounds like an overgrown Etonite. Fu Manchu, fooey.
Nonetheless, the film was successful enough to result in four sequels. "The first one should have been the last one", Lee wrote in 1983, "because it was the only really good one."

Sequels 
 The Brides of Fu Manchu (1966)
 The Vengeance of Fu Manchu (1967)
 The Blood of Fu Manchu (1968)
 The Castle of Fu Manchu (1969)

References

External links

 
 
 The Face of Fu Manchu at BFI Screenonline
 
 

1965 films
1960s adventure thriller films
1960s crime thriller films
British adventure thriller films
British crime thriller films
West German films
1960s English-language films
English-language German films
Films directed by Don Sharp
Films set in the 1920s
Films shot in the Republic of Ireland
Films based on British novels
German crime thriller films
Fu Manchu films
Films set in London
Films about chemical war and weapons
Films shot in County Dublin
Films set in the Republic of China (1912–1949)
1960s British films
1960s German films